Elachista acenteta is a moth of the family Elachistidae. It is found in North America in Nova Scotia, Ontario, Quebec, Colorado and Nebraska.

The length of the forewings is 4.5–6.2 mm. The basal fifth of the costa of the forewings is grey. The ground colour is snow-white. The hindwings vary in colour from dark to light grey. The underside of the wings is grey.

References

Moths described in 1948
acenteta
Moths of North America